The 2011 Monza Superbike World Championship round was the fourth round of the 2011 Superbike World Championship. It took place on the weekend of May 6–8, 2011 at the Autodromo Nazionale Monza located in Monza, Italy.

Results

Superbike race 1 classification

Superbike race 2 classification

Supersport race classification

External links
 The official website of the Superbike World Championship

Monza Round
Monza Superbike World Championship Round